John Robert Buczkowski (May 5, 1964 – May 23, 2018) was a professional football defensive end in the National Football League (NFL) who played for the Los Angeles Raiders in 1986 and 1987, as well as the Phoenix Cardinals and the Cleveland Browns. He played college football for the University of Pittsburgh. He attended Gateway Senior High School in Monroeville, Pennsylvania.

Legal Battles
Buczowski was placed under house arrest on June 9th, 2007 for possession and delivery of a controlled substance; promoting prostitution; criminal conspiracy; and participating in a corrupt organization.

Health and death
Buczkowski suffered from several illnesses.  He was found dead in his Monroeville, PA, home by his son.  An autopsy is pending though no foul play is suspected.

References

1964 births
2018 deaths
American football defensive ends
Players of American football from Pittsburgh
Los Angeles Raiders players
Phoenix Cardinals players
Cleveland Browns players
Pittsburgh Panthers football players
National Football League replacement players